Nantachot Pona (born March 13, 1982) or formerly Phaisan Pona, is a retired professional footballer from Thailand. He is a defender who scored 1 goal for the national team.

He played for Chonburi  in the 2008 AFC Champions League group stages.

Honours

Club
Chonburi F.C.
 Thailand Premier League: 2007
 Thai FA Cup: 2010
 Kor Royal Cup: 2008, 2011

International goals

References 

1982 births
Living people
Nantachot Pona
Nantachot Pona
Association football central defenders
Nantachot Pona
Nantachot Pona
Nantachot Pona
Nantachot Pona
Nantachot Pona
Nantachot Pona
Nantachot Pona
Nantachot Pona
Nantachot Pona